Adam Brothers may refer to:

Scottish architects, three sons of William Adam:
John Adam (architect) (1721–1792)
Robert Adam (1728–1792), also an interior designer and furniture designer
James Adam (architect) (1732–1794), also a furniture designer

French sculptors, three sons of Jacob-Sigisbert Adam:
Lambert-Sigisbert Adam (1700–1759)
Nicolas-Sébastien Adam (1705–1778)
François Gaspard Adam (1710–1761)

See also
 Clerkenwell crime syndicate, composed of three brothers surnamed Adams